Jaiswal Jains are one of the Jain communities of northern India. They are mainly located in the Gwalior/Agra region. The term "Jaiswal" indicated as being residents of a place named Jayas or Jais.

Some authors have identified Jais with Jais in Raebareli district. A legend identifies it as Jaisalmer. However there are documented mentions of Jaiswal Jains prior to the settlement of Jaisalmer. The famous Dubkund Jain inscription of 1088 AD is the earliest mention of the Jayas town. The Apabhraṃśa Jain poet Lakshmana composed the Jinadatta Charitra in sam. 1275 and Anuvaya Rayana Payiiva in sam. 1313, both at Tihuangiri near Bayana. Thus the place Jayas must have been in the vicinity of Gwalior region. Several of the cave temples on the sides of the Gwalior Fort hill have inscriptions mentioning that they were constructed by Jaiswals. Some of the patrons of poet Raidhu in Gwalior were Jaiswal.

Prominent Jaiswal Jains
 Poet Bulakhichand, author of Vachankosha in sam. 1707
 Dr. Nemichandra Shastri Jyotishacharya 1922-1974
 Ravindra Jain, poet and music director

External links
 Reports By India Archaeological Survey, Archaeological Survey of India, v.20 1882-1883  page 99

See also
 Jain community

References

Social groups of Rajasthan
Jain communities
People from Amethi district